Marie-Thérèse Sanchez-Schmid (born 15 November 1957) is a French politician who served as a Member of the European Parliament from 2009 until 2014, representing the South-West France constituency. She is a member of the Radical Party.

She is an assistant to the Mayor of Perpignan, Jean-Paul Alduy and an English teacher. In the 2009 European elections, she was the fourth candidate on the Union for a Popular Movement list in the South-West region, and was elected to the European Parliament.

External links 
 European Parliament:Marie-Thérèse Sanchez-Schmidt

1957 births
Living people
MEPs for South-West France 2009–2014
21st-century women MEPs for France
Radical Party (France) MEPs